Heavy T.O. was a two-day heavy metal and hard rock festival held at Downsview Park in Toronto in 2011 and 2012.

Announcement
Heavy T.O. was officially announced on 21 March 2011. On 22 March 2013 it was announced by Heavy MTL that there would be no Heavy TO festival in 2013.

2012 lineup

Saturday, 11 August
 Slipknot
 Marilyn Manson
 In Flames
 Suicidal Tendencies
 Trivium
 Dillinger Escape Plan
 Gojira
 Overkill
 Cancer Bats
 Dance Laury Dance
 Protest the Hero
 So Sick Social Club

Sunday, 12 August
 System of a Down
 Deftones
 Five Finger Death Punch
 Killswitch Engage
 Cannibal Corpse
 Kataklysm
 Between the Buried and Me
 Veil of Maya
 Job for a Cowboy
 Goatwhore
 The Faceless
 Periphery
 Exhumed
 Fleshgod Apocalypse
 Origin
 Rose Funeral

2011 lineup

Saturday 23 July 2011
 Megadeth
 Motörhead
 Opeth
 Anthrax
 Children of Bodom
 As I Lay Dying
 The Sword (couldn't play due to travel issues)
 Times of Grace
 DevilDriver
 Diamond Head
 Underoath
 Endast

Sunday 24 July 2011
 Rob Zombie
 Billy Talent
 Slayer
 Mastodon
 Testament
 Baptized in Blood
 Anvil
 Melissa Auf der Maur
 Volbeat
 Death Angel
 Exodus
 Dead and Divine

Heavy MTL
Heavy MTL is a two-day heavy metal and hard rock festival in Montreal, Quebec, at Parc Jean-Drapeau on Île Sainte-Hélène held in the summer. The 2008 edition attracted a crowd of around 36,000 people.

Artists who played at the inaugural Heavy MTL festival include: Iron Maiden, Mötley Crüe, Disturbed, Mastodon, Symphony X, Lamb of God, 3 Inches of Blood and many more. Slayer played at the second edition of the festival, not the inaugural.

References
Citations

External links
 Heavy TO Homepage

Music festivals in Toronto
Heavy metal festivals in Canada
Music festivals established in 2011